Slag Pile Annie is the name of a ghost reputed to haunt the former Jones and Laughlin Steel Corporation mill in Pittsburgh, Pennsylvania.  According to the story, she appeared as an elderly woman working in a remote and hard-to-access part of the mill.  The steelworkers who spoke to her did not know they were speaking to a ghost until their coworkers told them her story.

See also
 List of ghosts

References 
 Swetnam, G. 1988. Devils, Ghosts, and Witches: Occult Folklore of the Upper Ohio Valley. Greensburg, PA: MacDonald Sward Publishing. 117 pp. .
 Trapani, B.E. & C.J. Adams III. 1994. Ghost Stories of Pittsburgh and Allegheny County. Reading, PA: Exeter House Books. 174 pp. .

American ghosts
Culture of Pittsburgh